Gamunu Mahinda Wijesuriya (5 August 1934 – 19 March 2007: as ), was an actor in Sri Lankan cinema, theatre, radio and television as well as a broadcaster, comedian, singer and radio program producer. A tall skinny personality, Wijesuriye is a renowned comedian in Sinhala cinema and a dubbing artist.

Personal life
Wijesuriya was born on 5 August 1934 in Dewalapola, Sri Lanka. He studied at Udugampola Maha Vidyalaya. He was married to Maali and had two children.

Wijesuriya died on  19 March 2007 in Colombo.

Career
He started his career as a radio artist joining the Radio Ceylon (currently known as Sri Lanka Broadcasting Corporation) with Lama Pitiya, a popular radio programme produced by Karunaratne Abeysekera for the children of the country. He was a popular radio artist and comedian who contributed the radio programmes like Muwanpalassa and Vinoda Samaya and he contributed to the Sinhala Cinema as an actor for Sinhala films like Dulika, Thun Man Handiya, Hara Lakshaya, Handaya, Binaramalee and Re Daniel Dawal Migel 2.

Wijesuriya gave his voice for some Tele-Cartoons like Dosthara Hondahita and Pissu Poosa produced by Titus Thotawatte for Rasaara telecast by Sri Lanka Rupavahini Corporation. He was capable of performing with many different voices to different characters in the same programme.

Filmography

See also
Karunaratne Abeysekera
Titus Thotawatte

References

Sri Lankan radio personalities
Sri Lankan comedians
Sri Lankan Buddhists
1934 births
2007 deaths
20th-century comedians